Aleynikovo is a rural locality (a selo) and the administrative center of Aleynikovskoye Rural Settlement, Alexeyevsky District, Belgorod Oblast, Russia. The population was 490 as of 2010. There are 11 streets.

Geography 
Aleynikovo is located 27 km southeast of Alexeyevka (the district's administrative centre) by road. Novosyolovka is the nearest rural locality.

References 

Rural localities in Alexeyevsky District, Belgorod Oblast
Biryuchensky Uyezd